Damir Šolman (born 7 September 1948) is a Croatian former professional basketball player.

Professional career
Šolman was a FIBA European Selection, in 1974.

National team career
Šolman competed with the senior Yugoslavian national basketball team in the 1968 Summer Olympics, the 1972 Summer Olympics, and in the 1976 Summer Olympics (where he was the team's captain), With the Yugoslav national team, he played in 226 caps, and scored 1,785 points.

See also
Yugoslav First Federal Basketball League career stats leaders

References

1948 births
Living people
Basketball players at the 1968 Summer Olympics
Basketball players at the 1972 Summer Olympics
Basketball players at the 1976 Summer Olympics
Croatian men's basketball players
KK Split players
Olympic basketball players of Yugoslavia
Olympic medalists in basketball
Olympic silver medalists for Yugoslavia
Yugoslav men's basketball players
1970 FIBA World Championship players
1974 FIBA World Championship players
Basketball players from Zagreb
Medalists at the 1976 Summer Olympics
Medalists at the 1968 Summer Olympics
Mediterranean Games gold medalists for Yugoslavia
Competitors at the 1967 Mediterranean Games
Competitors at the 1971 Mediterranean Games
Small forwards
FIBA World Championship-winning players
Mediterranean Games medalists in basketball